Luiza Pendyk (born 23 September 1970) is a Polish former professional footballer who played as a forward for the Poland women's national football team. At club level she played for multiple teams in Sweden and was the Damallsvenskan top goal scorer on two occasions.

Club career
Born in Lubań but raised in Wrocław, Pendyk emerged with the AZS Wrocław club. She transferred to Czarni Sosnowiec and quickly became recognised as one of the best players in the country.

Pendyk continued her football career in Sweden, initially with Tyresö FF. In a long and successful spell in Swedish football she was the Damallsvenskan top goal scorer on two consecutive occasions: 1999 and 2000.

After five seasons with Malmö FF, Pendyk retired from football to focus on her studies. However, she agreed to return to the club part way through the following 2001 season, after which she retired again. Altogether Pendyk scored 163 goals in 161 games for Malmö.

In July 2002 Pendyk agreed to join local lower division team Staffanstorps GIF, where some former Malmö team mates also played. She finished the 2002 Söderettan season with seven goals to her credit. She decided to remain in Sweden after her football career and took Swedish citizenship.

International career
Pendyk won her first cap for Poland on 27 June 1987, in a 1–1 friendly draw with Czechoslovakia at BKS Stadium, Bielsko-Biała. She scored an equaliser with two minutes left in the match after entering play as a 39th-minute substitute. The goal was a "beautiful" header from 16 metres.

After moving to play club football in Sweden, Pendyk fell into dispute with the Polish national team and made herself unavailable for selection. Her 25th and final appearance was as captain in a 4–1 UEFA Women's Euro 1993 qualifying defeat by Italy at WKS Wawel Stadium in Kraków on 27 September 1992.

The Swedish Football Association made an unsuccessful attempt to naturalise Pendyk to play for the Sweden women's national football team. The plan failed because Pendyk's earlier appearances for Poland made her ineligible under FIFA rules to switch her allegiances.

International statistics

International goals
''As of match played 27 September 1992. Poland score listed first, score column indicates score after each Pendyk goal.

References

External links

1970 births
Living people
Polish women's footballers
Poland women's international footballers
KKS Czarni Sosnowiec players
Expatriate women's footballers in Sweden
Polish expatriate footballers
Polish expatriate sportspeople in Sweden
Tyresö FF players
Mallbackens IF players
FC Rosengård players
Damallsvenskan players
People from Lubań County
Sportspeople from Lower Silesian Voivodeship
Women's association football forwards
Polish emigrants to Sweden